Thunder Entered Her is a choral piece written by the English composer John Tavener in 1990. It was commissioned by the St Albans Chamber Choir and it is written for SATB chorus, handbells and pipe organ.

The simple lyrics "Thunder entered her / And made no sound" are taken from the Hymns on the Nativity of Saint Ephrem the Syrian (c. 306–373), and describe the virginal conception of Jesus within Mary. The characteristic juxtaposition by Ephrem of opposites or paradoxical elements continues as the child is described as "The Shepherd of all ... [who] became a lamb." The quotation ends with a lamb entering the world "bleating", featuring a melismatic tenor solo.

The multi-layered composition features a ritualistic use of handbells. Tavener employs spatial techniques such as placing a smaller chorus, which intones the Velichayem [We magnify you], and the handbells at a distance from the main chorus. Tension is built by adding low organ roulades representing thunder that punctuate the text and are accompanied by several "Amen" from the main body of the choir. The work closes with a tenor solo, marked "The Sacrificial Lamb", which represents the birth and Passion of Christ.

Lyrics

Notable recordings 
Notable recordings of this composition include:

References

Choral compositions
Compositions by John Tavener
1990 compositions